is a Japanese video game developer and publisher. The company was founded in 1991 and has developed several role-playing video games, most notably the Disgaea and Marl Kingdom series.  Its mascot is the penguin-like Disgaea character Prinny.

NIS America, a localization and global publishing branch of the company, was founded in 2003. It originally focused solely on the North American market until being expanded to include Europe and other regions in 2007 and has also published anime.

History
Nippon Ichi Software was founded in September 1991 in Gifu Prefecture, Japan, as an entertainment software company. It was relocated and reincorporated on July 12, 1993. The company has made several acquisitions, mergers, and forming new subsidiaries. In the early 2010s, the company formed Nippon Ichi Software Asia Pte. Ltd and Nippon Ichi Software Vietnam Co., Ltd. In 2016, NIS merged with System Prisma Corporation and acquired developer FOG Inc. In 2012, the company was awarded the Guinness World Record for being the company that released the most strategy RPGs.

The company has developed a number of traditional role-playing video games. Many characters from previous games make their way into later games as secret characters, even though their respective games may not be directly connected. Their flagship franchise, Disgaea, takes place in the same universe.

Games

Nippon Ichi Indie Spirits
Nippon Ichi Indie Spirits, a label under which the company localises non-Japanese indie games for the Japanese market, was formed on December 28, 2016. The label's first games, Nidhogg, Back to Bed, and Emily Wants to Play, were released in February 2017. All games that are published through this program are only released digitally.

NIS America
NIS America, a localization and global publishing branch of Nippon Ichi Software, was founded on December 24, 2003. Based in Santa Ana, California, it originally focused solely on the North American market until being expanded to include Europe and other regions in 2007. The branch was the result of the company's wish to focus on international publication of their works in the United States, given the increased popularity of their games outside of Japan. Prior to 2003, NIS games were released in English by contracted publishers. Some of the company's more well-known releases include entries in the Atelier, Ys, and Trails series, among others.

Games

Anime

Personnel
 is a chief executive officer of Studio ToOefuf and video game artist employed by Nippon Ichi whose art has been featured in video games such as Disgaea, Phantom Brave, Makai Kingdom, and Fate/Grand Order. His art style has been described as "crazy and bizarre" and features everything from demon children, to freaky pigs in royal clothing. His signature character, Pleinair, has appeared in Disgaea and Phantom Brave.

Notes

References

External links
  
  (NIS America)

 
Amusement companies of Japan
Anime companies
Japanese companies established in 1991
Video game companies established in 1991
Home video companies of the United States
Japanese brands
Video game companies of Japan
Video game development companies
Video game publishers
Companies based in Gifu Prefecture
Kakamigahara, Gifu